Sum Alahi Mang (or Sum Ellahi Mang) is a village and union council (an administrative subdivision) of Mansehra District in Khyber-Pakhtunkhwa province of Pakistan.The people of SUM ELAHI MANG  speak a different languages which includes Urdu, Hindko, Gojri, Kohistani and Pashto. The majority areas speak Hinko Gojri and Kohistani  whereas Urdu is understood throughout the area.

References

Union councils of Mansehra District
Populated places in Mansehra District